Shiloh is an unincorporated community in King George County, Virginia, United States.

References

Unincorporated communities in Virginia
Unincorporated communities in King George County, Virginia